Herbert J. "Herb" Perez (born December 6, 1959) is a former US Olympian in taekwondo and a politician. He was a gold medalist in the 1992 Barcelona Olympics.

Personal life
Perez was born in New York City to a Polish mother and a Puerto Rican father. He attended Rutgers Law School. He did his undergraduate degree at William Paterson University and earned a master's degree in sport organization management from the International Olympic Committee's program at the University of Lyon, France. Perez became a city councilman and mayor for Foster City, California, where he is the owner of Gold Medal Martial Arts. He has earned his eighth degree black belt in taekwondo. He served as chairman for the World Taekwondo Federation Education Committee and Vice Chair of the World Taekwondo Federation Technical Committee along with Steven Capener. Together they created and implemented the multi-tiered scoring system in place today along with the video review protocol.

Martial arts
Perez won bronze medals at both the 1987 and 1991 World Taekwondo Championships, and won the 1987 World Cup Championships in Helsinki.  He was involved in a scoring controversy as the head of the Taekwondo team at the 2008 Summer Olympics.

He starred as himself (with the nickname "Olympus") on the 1995-1997 martial arts TV series WMAC Masters.

Herb Perez became a prominent critic of electronic scoring in the 2016 Summer Olympics taekwondo competition.  His career and criticism were highlighted in a feature story in the September 2016 issue of Tae Kwon Do Life Magazine called "Herb Perez: Modern Renaissance Man".

Political career
Perez was elected to the council of the City of Foster City in 2011. He was re-elected for another four-year term on November 3, 2015. He briefly served as Mayor and Vice-Mayor before being recalled on March 3, 2020, in the California Primary elections. Retired Police Chief and longtime Foster City resident Jon Froomin was selected to replace Perez on the council until the term for his seat expires in November 2020.

References 

Living people
1959 births
American male taekwondo practitioners
Sportspeople from New York City
Medalists at the 1992 Summer Olympics
William Paterson University alumni
University of Lyon alumni
Taekwondo practitioners at the 1992 Summer Olympics
Mayors of places in California
People from Foster City, California
Pan American Games medalists in taekwondo
Pan American Games gold medalists for the United States
Pan American Games silver medalists for the United States
Taekwondo practitioners at the 1987 Pan American Games
Taekwondo practitioners at the 1991 Pan American Games
Olympic gold medalists for the United States in taekwondo
Medalists at the 1987 Pan American Games
Medalists at the 1991 Pan American Games
World Taekwondo Championships medalists